Pressure rate product (also known as Cardiovascular Product or Double Product), within medical cardiology, specifically for cardiovascular physiology and exercise physiology is used to determine the myocardial workload.

Description

The calculation formula is:
Rate Pressure Product (RPP) = Heart Rate (HR) * Systolic Blood Pressure (SBP)

The units for the Heart Rate are beats per minute and for the Blood Pressure mmHg.

Rate pressure product is a measure of the stress put on the cardiac muscle based on the number of times it needs to beat per minute (HR) and the arterial blood pressure that it is pumping against (SBP).  It will be a direct indication of the energy demand of the heart and thus a good measure of the energy consumption of the heart.

The rate pressure product allows you to calculate the internal workload or hemodynamic response.

References

External links
 Rate pressure calculator

Cardiovascular physiology